Jonathan Ezequiel Rodrigo Torres (born 11 May 1983) is a retired Argentine footballer who played as a forward.

Career
Torres' career began in 2004 with San Miguel in Primera C Metropolitana, with the forward making nine appearances for the club. Later that year, Torres was signed by Colegiales. Twenty-nine goals in eighty-one matches followed, which preceded a stint with Comunicaciones of Primera B Metropolitana during 2007–08; a season which his parent club ended with promotion. He returned to Colegiales in 2008, before departing for a second time to sign for Primera B Nacional side Deportivo Merlo. His first appearance arrived on 22 August 2009 against Aldosivi, as he featured for the full ninety minutes of a 2–0 loss.

After being selected ten times by Deportivo Merlo, Torres left for a third spell with Colegiales. This spell with the club lasted two years, as Torres agreed to join Acassuso in 2012; overall, Torres scored fifteen goals in one hundred and fifteen appearances for Colegiales in his two latter spells in Primera B Metropolitana. Torres' period with Acassuso was followed with a seventeen-month stint with Excursionistas, which culminated with a loan spell out with Justo José de Urquiza. Six months into his loan with Justo José de Urquiza, the forward was signed permanently by the Primera C Metropolitana club for 2016.

On 30 June 2017, Torres joined fellow fourth tier team Sportivo Barracas. He left a year later after scoring once in twenty-two matches.

Career statistics
.

References

External links

1983 births
Living people
People from San Isidro, Buenos Aires
Argentine footballers
Association football forwards
Primera C Metropolitana players
Primera B Metropolitana players
Primera Nacional players
Club Atlético San Miguel footballers
Club Atlético Colegiales (Argentina) players
Club Comunicaciones footballers
Deportivo Merlo footballers
Club Atlético Acassuso footballers
CA Excursionistas players
Asociación Social y Deportiva Justo José de Urquiza players
Sportivo Barracas players
Sportspeople from Buenos Aires Province